Martin Hess (born 11 January 1971) is a German politician for the populist Alternative for Germany (AfD) and since 2017 member of the Bundestag.

Life and achievements

Hess was born 1971 in the West German township of Hechingen and became a police officer at the Baden-Württemberg Police.

Hess entered the newly founded Alternative for Germany (AfD) in 2013 and became a member of the Bundestag, the German federal law-making body in 2017.

In February 2019 he lost a crucial vote at a state political convention (Landesparteitag) of the AfD in Baden-Württemberg against Dirk Spaniel.

References

1971 births
People from Hechingen
Members of the Bundestag for Baden-Württemberg
Living people
Members of the Bundestag 2021–2025
Members of the Bundestag 2017–2021
Members of the Bundestag for the Alternative for Germany